Nunatak Glacier, also known as Nunatak Glacier,  is a glacier in King Christian X Land, Northeast Greenland. Administratively it lies in the Northeast Greenland National Park zone. 

The area where the glacier flows is remote and uninhabited.

History
This glacier was named Nunatak glacieren in 1899 by Swedish Arctic explorer and geologist A.G. Nathorst during the expedition he led to Greenland in search of survivors of S. A. Andrée's Arctic balloon expedition of 1897. The name was chosen owing to the tops of nunataks appearing to overhang it.

Geography
The Nunatak Glacier originates at the eastern end of the Adolf Hoel Glacier, south of the area of the Jakob Kjøde Bjerg nunatak. Strindberg Land lies to the east and the northeastern end of Andrée Land on its western side. 
It flows in a roughly northwest to southeast direction for about  until its terminus at the head of the Geologfjord. The Eyvind Fjeld Glacier flows beyond the northwestern end of the Nunatak Glacier, to the west of Jakob Kjøde Bjerg.

Bibliography
A. K. Higgins, Jane A. Gilotti, M. Paul Smith (eds.), The Greenland Caledonides: Evolution of the Northeast Margin of Laurentia.
Louise A. Boyd and R. H. Menzies. Fiords of East Greenland: A Photographic Reconnaissance throughout the Franz Josef and King Oscar Flords, Geographical Review Vol. 22, No. 4 (Oct., 1932), pp. 529-561

See also
List of glaciers in Greenland

References

External links
Nunatak Glacier at Geologist Fjord, Northeast Greenland
Greenland Pilot - Danish Geodata Agency

Glaciers of Greenland

ceb:Nunatakgletscher
nl:Nunatakgletsjer
sv:Nunatakgletscher